Experimental models of Alzheimer's disease are organism or cellular models used in research to investigate biological questions about Alzheimer's disease as well as develop and test novel therapeutic treatments. Alzheimer's disease is a progressive neurodegenerative disorder associated with aging, which occurs both sporadically (the most common form of diagnosis) or due to familial passed mutations in genes associated with Alzheimer's pathology. Common symptoms associated with Alzheimer's disease include: memory loss, confusion, and mood changes.

As Alzheimer's disease affects around 55 million patients globally and accounts for approximately 60-70% of all dementia cases, billions of dollars are spent yearly towards research to better understand the biological mechanisms of the disease as well as develop effective therapeutic treatments for it. Researchers commonly use post-mortem human tissue or experimental models to conduct experiments relating to Alzheimer's disease. Experimental models of Alzheimer's disease are particularly useful as they allow complex manipulation of biological systems to elucidate questions about Alzheimer's disease without the risk of harming humans. These models often have genetic modifications that enable them to be more representative of human Alzheimer's disease and its associated pathology: extracellular amyloid-beta (Aβ) plaques and intracellular neurofibrillary tangles (NFTs). Current methods used by researchers are: traditional 2D cell culture, 3D cell culture, microphysiological systems, and animal models.

Cell culture models

2D cell culture 
Traditional two dimensional cell culture is a useful experimental model of Alzheimer's disease to conduct experiments in a high throughput manner. These cultures occur on a dish or flask in a monolayer and can be made up of a single cell type or multiple cell types. 2D cultures often have difficulties producing insoluble Amyloid-β plaques even when they are able to secrete the Amyloid-β peptide. Common types of 2D cell culture used to model Alzheimer's disease are immortalized cell lines, primary neuron cultures, and patient derived induced pluripotent stem cells (iPSC).

Immortalized cell lines 
Immortalized cell lines are cells from an organism which have been genetically manipulated to be able to proliferate in vitro, making them a useful tool for researchers as they can do so quickly allowing for high-throughput experimentation. These mutations can occur from a natural caused mutation, like those found in cancer cells, or from being introduced by researchers. Common immortalized cell lines used to study Alzheimer's disease include: human embryonic kidney 293 (HEK293), human neuroblastoma (SH-SY5Y), human neuroglioma (H4), human embryonic mesencephalic (LUHMES), human neural progenitor (ReN), and pheochromocytoma (PC12) cells. These types of cells are commercially available, relatively inexpensive, and easy to culture and maintain. Pro-death compounds can be used in these models to induce Alzheimer's disease related cell death. These compounds include: Amyloid-β 42, tau protein, glutamic acid, and oxidative/pro-inflammatory compounds.

Primary neuron culture 
Primary neuron cultures are generated from embryonic or postnatal rodent brain tissue and cultured on plates. Common brain regions used for cultures to study Alzheimer's disease include the hippocampus, cortex, and amygdala; however any brain region is suitable for cultures. This method requires dissection of the desired brain region from rodent tissue followed by digestion, dissociation, and plating steps. As these cultures are derived directly from rodent brain tissue, they morphologically and physiologically resemble human brain cells, contain multiple neuronal cell types, and do not proliferate. When initially cultured, these cells are spherical and over time begin to form axons, dendrites, and eventually develop synaptic connections.

Induced pluripotent stem cells 

Patient-derived induced pluripotent stem cell (iPSC) lines are unique in which differentiated somatic cells are taken from Alzheimer's disease patients and reverted into pluripotent stem cells via an ectopic transcriptional "Tamanaka" factor cocktail. These stem cells can then be directed to differentiate into many cell types, including neurons, astrocytes, microglia, oligodendrocytes, pericytes, and endothelial cells. This allows these models to be generated from both early-onset familial Alzheimer's disease (FAD) patients with mutations in APP, PSEN1, or PSEN2 genes as well as late-onset/sporadic Alzheimer's disease (SAD) patients, a population which is not wholly replicated in animal models. As SAD is the most commonly diagnosed form of AD, this highlights iPSCs as key tools for understanding this form of the disease. These cells can also be purchased commercially. CRISPR-Cas9 technology can be used alongside iPSC cells to generate neurons carrying multiple FAD mutations. One major downfall of these models are that they can inadequately resemble mature neurons as well as being more expensive and difficult to maintain. iPSCs have also been shown to exhibit genomic instability and develop additional mutations when passaged (harvested and reseeded into daughter cultures) numerous times, posing both safety concerns for patient use as well as potential reproducibility problems in experimental studies. Due to the nature of reprogramming procedures, iPSC cells lose cellular and epigenetic signatures acquired by aging and environmental factors, limiting iPSCs ability to recapitulate diseases associated with aging, like Alzheimer's disease. While these cultures have some limitations, many fundamental discoveries about Alzheimer's disease biology have been elucidated using this model system.

3D organoid culture 
Three dimensional organoid culture methods have become a popular way of recapitulating AD pathology in a more "brain-like" environment than traditional 2D culture as they create a organized structure similar to that of the human cortex. This has proven effective specifically for modeling Alzheimer's disease as 2D cultures tend to fail at producing insoluble amyloid-β while 3D culture models are able. These models consist of multiple neuronal cell types co-cultured together in artificial matrices allowing for the understanding of how non-neuronal cells and neuroinflammation influence Alzheimer's disease pathogenesis. The neuronal cell types expressed in these models often include neurons, astrocytes, microglia, oligodendrocytes, epithelial, and endothelial cells. These organoids develop over many months in order to display Alzheimer's pathology and can be maintained for long periods of time. They can be derived from both iPSCs or immortalized undifferentiated cells and typically reach a diameter of several millimeters. 3D cultures can either be allowed to self-organize or be placed under guided formation in which exogenous factors influence the differentiation pattern of the organoid. 3D culture methods have shown more robust Amyloid-β aggregation, phosphorylated-tau accumulation, and endosome abnormalities than 2D culture methods of the same cell lines, indicating accelerated pathology.

Common issues arising from the use of 3D cultures is the lack of vasculature within the organoid, leading to cell death and dysfunction at inner layers. Current efforts are focusing on introducing endothelial cells into guided formation cultures in order to create vascular systems and provide nutrient distribution to deep layers. Self-organizing organoids also vary in terms in proportion and location of expressed cells causing challenges in reproducibility of experiments. More effort has been placed on guided formation organoids to account for this problem, however this method is more time consuming and difficult to optimize. 3D organoid culture's ability to resemble aging phenotypes is also limited as many organoid methods rely on iPSCs which are more similar to prenatal brain cells due to reprograming protocols. Researchers are currently investigating common transcriptional profiles associated with Alzheimer's disease and aging in order to reintroduce these lanscapes into iPSCs for future biomedical research and therapeutic development.

Microphysiological systems 
Neuronal microphysiological systems, also referred to as a "brain-on-a-chip," are a combination of 3D cultures and a microfluidics platform, which circulates the media provided to the cultured cells. These devices are beneficial as they improve cell viability and better model physiological conditions as they improve oxygen availability and nutrient delivery to inner layers of 3D cultures. These systems additionally introduce physiological cues such as fluid sheer stress, tension, and compression which allows these in vitro conditions to better resemble the in vivo environment. Microphysiological systems were shown to replicate Amyloid-β aggregation, hyperphosphorylated tau, and neuroinflamation as well as display microglial recruitment, release of cytokines and chemokines, and microglial neurotoxic activation as a response of more physiologically relevant cell-cell interactions. These systems can also be developed incorporating brain endothelial cells to mimic the blood–brain barrier, making this an extremely useful model for BBB dysfunction in Alzheimer's disease, screening novel therapeutics potential to pass from the blood into the brain, therapeutic pharmacokinetics, as well as drug adsorption, distribution, metabolism, elimination, and toxicity (ADMET) tendencies.

Animal models

Rodents 

Rodent animal models of Alzheimer's disease are commonly used in research as rodents and humans have many of the same major brain regions and neurotransmitter systems. These models are small, easy to house, as well as breed very well. Mice and rats on average tend to live for 2 years, a much shorter lifespan than humans, presenting both limitations as well as benefits for more rapid experiment completion.

In order to recapitulate and accelerate human Alzheimer's disease pathology, scientists commonly introduce FAD associated mutations. Common genes targeted for genetic engineering in animal models are APP, MAPT, PSEN1, PSEN2, and APOE. This results in the animal models having a higher tendency to form amyloid-β plaques and/or neurofibrillary tangles, the two pathological hallmarks of Alzheimer's disease. These mutated genes can either be over-expressed (first generation models) or expressed at endogenous levels (second generation models) as a way of further replicating disease pathology. Scientists also over-express non-mutated human genes in the hope of seeing similar Alzheimer's disease pathology. These introduced mutations or over-expression of human Alzheimer's associated genes, can lead these animals to additionally display cognitive impairment, deficits in long-term potentiation (LTP), synaptic loss, gliosis, and neuronal loss. As current models are highly reliant on FAD mutations to induce Alzheimer's like pathology, there is still no ideal model that fully replicates SAD (sporadic Alzheimer's disease), which is the most common type of diagnosis in patients.

Common methods used to generate these lines are the use of transgenes controlled by a specific promoter, Cre-Lox recombination, and the CRISPR-Cas9 system. Scientists can also use injection methods such as intracerebroventricular injection, intravenous injection, or intrahippocampal injection to modify wild type rodents into displaying Alzheimer's disease pathology. These rodent models are often used to test and develop drugs treating Alzheimer's disease before progressing to clinical trials in humans.

Mouse models

Rat models

Non-human primates 
Non-human primates can be used by researchers to study mechanisms of Alzheimer's disease as well as develop therapeutics. Non-human primates are useful as they have a more similar aging pattern to humans compared to rodent models. During non-human primate aging, they can display neuropathy, cognitive changes, and amyloid-β deposits, similar to that of Alzheimer's disease. While these models are useful in studying the process of aging, they are not always exact models of Alzheimer's disease. Common non-human primates used in AD research include: rhesus monkeys (Macaca mulattas), stump-tailed macaques (Macaca arctoides), mouse lemurs (Microcebus murinus), the common marmoset (Callithrix jacchus), and crab-eating macaques (Macaca fascicularis). These models can be studied both spontaneously or through artificial induction of Alzheimer's disease responses. Common techniques used to induce these models include: cholinergic nervous system injury, amyloid-β injection, intrinsic formaldehyde, and streptozotocin (a methyl nitrosourea sugar compound which induces diabetes).

Alternative organisms 

 Zebrafish
 Drosophila
 Caenorhabditis elegans

References 

Alzheimer's disease research